Christian Nielsen (born 23 June 1932) is a Belgian sailor. He competed in the Finn event at the 1952 Summer Olympics.

References

External links
 

1932 births
Possibly living people
Belgian male sailors (sport)
Olympic sailors of Belgium
Sailors at the 1952 Summer Olympics – Finn
Sportspeople from Mechelen